Aude Biannic (born 27 March 1991) is a French road bicycle racer, who currently rides for UCI Women's WorldTeam . She competed at the 2012 Summer Olympics in the Women's road race, finishing 10th.

Major results

2008
 1st  Road race, National Junior Road Championships
 2nd Individual pursuit, National Junior Track Championships
2009
 2nd  Points race, UEC European Junior Track Championships
 National Junior Road Championships
2nd Time trial
3rd Road race
 8th Road race, UCI Juniors World Championships
2010
 1st  Time trial, National Under-23 Road Championships
 4th Road race, UEC European Under-23 Road Championships
2011
 7th Overall Tour de Bretagne Féminin
 7th Overall Tour Cycliste Féminin International de l'Ardèche
 10th Road race, UCI Road World Championships
2012
 2nd Time trial, National Under-23 Road Championships
 3rd Overall Tour de Bretagne Féminin
 4th Halle-Buizingen
 7th Time trial, UEC European Under-23 Road Championships
 7th Cholet Pays de Loire Dames
 10th Road race, Olympic Games
2013
 3rd  Road race, Jeux de la Francophonie
 National Road Championships
3rd Road race
3rd Under-23 time trial
 UEC European Under-23 Road Championships
4th Time trial
9th Road race
 10th Overall Giro della Toscana Int. Femminile – Memorial Michela Fanini
1st Stage 4
 10th Cholet Pays de Loire Dames
2014
 3rd Time trial, National Road Championships
 3rd Overall La Route de France
 4th Overall Tour de Bretagne Féminin
 4th Grand Prix de Plumelec-Morbihan Dames
 6th Grand Prix de Dottignies
2015
 2nd Time trial, National Road Championships
 6th Overall Tour de Bretagne Féminin
 7th Overall Trophée d'Or Féminin
 8th Chrono Champenois
 10th La Classique Morbihan
2016
 10th Chrono des Nations
2017
 3rd Time trial, National Road Championships
2018
 1st  Road race, National Road Championships
 2nd Overall Belgium Tour
1st Prologue
 6th Overall Ladies Tour of Norway
2019
 3rd Road race, National Road Championships
 7th Omloop Het Nieuwsblad
2020
 3rd Time trial, National Road Championships
 6th Le Samyn des Dames
 10th Omloop Het Nieuwsblad
2021
 5th Overall The Women's Tour

References

External links

French female cyclists
1991 births
Living people
Olympic cyclists of France
Cyclists at the 2012 Summer Olympics
People from Landerneau
Sportspeople from Finistère
Cyclists from Brittany
21st-century French women